Rombo may refer to:

People
 Edward Rombo, Kenyan rugby player
 Elin Rombo (born 1976), Swedish operatic soprano

Places
 Rombo Division, Kenya
 Rombo District, Tanzania
 Ilhéus do Rombo
 Passo del Rombo mountain pass, also known as Timmelsjoch

Other
 Rombo language, spoken in Tanzania
 Rombo syndrome
 Rombo shrew, also known as Kilimanjaro shrew
 Rhombus, in Spanish, Italian, Portuguese and Esperanto